Alexandrovsk-Sakhalinsky (Japanese: Otchishi) is a town in Sakhalin Oblast, Russia, located near the Strait of Tartary on the western shores of northern Sakhalin Island at the foot of the western Sakhalin mountains. Population:    21,000 (1968).

History

A settlement called Alexandrovskaya on the present site of the town was first recorded in 1862. In 1869, an agricultural farm was established there, which later grew into the village of Alexandrovka. At the time, it was known as  among Japanese.

In 1881, a military post was established and became known as Alexandrovsky. The outpost served as the administrative center for managing katorga, prisons, exile settlements, and the whole island until the October Revolution. Anton Chekhov lived here in 1890 while gathering material for his book The Sakhalin Island.

Town status was granted to Alexandrovsky in 1917. During the Russian Civil War, the town was under the control of Admiral Alexander Kolchak in 1918–1920, before being occupied by the Japanese until 1925. It was known as  "Street of Port Alexander" during Japanese occupation between 1918 and 1925.

In 1926, the town was renamed Alexandrovsk-Sakhalinsky to distinguish it from other places of the same name.

Alexandrovsk-Sakhalinsky was the administrative center of Sakhalin Oblast between 1932 and 1947. It was also known as the coal mining center of the island during Soviet times.

Administrative and municipal status
Within the framework of administrative divisions, Alexandrovsk-Sakhalinsky serves as the administrative center of Alexandrovsk-Sakhalinsky District and is subordinated to it. As a municipal division, the town of Alexandrovsk-Sakhalinsky and thirteen rural localities of Alexandrovsk-Sakhalinsky District are incorporated as Alexandrovsk-Sakhalinsky Urban Okrug.

Economy and infrastructure
The economy of Alexandrovsk-Sakhalinsky is mainly reliant on its harbor, the oldest and previously most important on Sakhalin, and the mining of black coal in the local area.

Climate
Alexandrovsk-Sakhalinsky has a humid continental climate (Köppen climate classification Dfb) with short mild to warm summers and long, cold winters.

Gallery

References

Notes

Sources

External links

Official website of Alexandrovsk-Sakhalinsky 
Directory of organizations in Alexandrovsk-Sakhalinsky 

Cities and towns in Sakhalin Oblast